Gahvareh (also Romanized as Gahvāreh; also known as Gavāra and Gawareh) is a city and capital of Dalahu County, Kermanshah Province, Iran.  At the 2006 census, its population was 4,708, in 1,147 families. The city is populated by Kurds.

References

Populated places in Dalahu County

Cities in Kermanshah Province
Kurdish settlements in Kermanshah Province